David Eugene Thompson (February 28, 1854 – August 25, 1942) was an American diplomat.

Thompson was born in 1854 in Nebraska.  He was a diplomat, and served as U.S. Minister to Brazil between 1902 and 1905, U.S. Ambassador to Brazil in 1905, and U.S. Ambassador to Mexico between 1906 and 1909.

In 1917, Thompson was the subject of an attempted blackmail scheme, which was foiled.

References

 

|-

1854 births
1942 deaths
Ambassadors of the United States to Brazil
People from Nebraska
Ambassadors of the United States to Mexico